Matteson School District can refer to:
 Elementary School District 159 (also known as Matteson School District 159)
 Matteson School District 162